The Diary of Maria Tholo was a series of interviews with a South African resident of Soweto, Maria Tholo, which were published by Ravan Press as Tholo's 'diary' in 1979.

Maria Tholo was interviewed each week by a researcher, Carol Hermer, over a year starting in February 1976. Hermer chose to present the material "in diary format [...] to lend immediacy to the events."

The interviews spanned a period of time which included the Soweto uprising, in which police infamously fired on schoolchildren. Maria Tholo provided eyewitness testimony of the township rioting and its after-effects, juxtaposed with quotidian detail of her own immediate family life. This gave her account of the uprising "the ambivalence and complexity that history and hindsight sometimes erase".

References

External links
 The Diary of Maria Tholo by Carol Hermer

1979 non-fiction books
South African non-fiction books
Oral history books
Soweto
1976 in South Africa